Abdul Hashmi (born 4 September 1997) is a Danish cricketer. In September 2016, he was named in Denmark's squad for the 2016 ICC World Cricket League Division Four tournament in USA. He played in Denmark's last match of the tournament, against Bermuda.

In September 2018, he was named in Denmark's squad for the 2018 ICC World Cricket League Division Three tournament in Oman. In May 2019, he was named in Denmark's squad for a five-match series against Leinster Lightning in Ireland, in preparation for the Regional Finals of the 2018–19 ICC T20 World Cup Europe Qualifier tournament in Guernsey. The same month, he was named in Denmark's squad for the Regional Finals qualification tournament. He made his Twenty20 International (T20I) debut for Denmark, against Jersey, on 16 June 2019.

In August 2019, he was named in Denmark's squad for the 2019 Malaysia Cricket World Cup Challenge League A tournament. He made his List A debut for Denmark, against Malaysia, in the Cricket World Cup Challenge League A tournament on 16 September 2019.

References

External links
 

1997 births
Living people
Danish cricketers
Denmark Twenty20 International cricketers
Place of birth missing (living people)
Danish people of Pakistani descent
Sportspeople from Odense